Calliostoma aprosceptum is a species of sea snail, a marine gastropod mollusk in the family Calliostomatidae.

Description
The height of the shell attains 12 mm.

Distribution
This marine species occurs off New Caledonia.

References

 Vilvens C. (2009). New species and new records of Calliostomatidae (Gastropoda: Trochoidea) from New Caledonia and Solomon Islands. Novapex 10(4): 125-163

External links
 

aprosceptum
Gastropods described in 2009